Puri Sangeet  is a music company in India. It was established by Puri Jagannadh, an Indian Telugu film director and producer. The company is based in Hyderabad, Telangana.

Film soundtracks

References

Mass media companies of India
Music companies of India
Companies based in Hyderabad, India
Indian record labels
Indian music record labels
2009 establishments in Andhra Pradesh
Indian companies established in 2009